In mathematics, a matrix factorization of a polynomial is a technique for factoring irreducible polynomials with matrices. David Eisenbud proved that every multivariate real-valued polynomial p without linear terms can be written as a AB = pI, where A and B are square matrices and I is the identity matrix.  Given the polynomial p, the matrices A and B can be found by elementary methods.

Example:
The polynomial x2 + y2 is irreducible over R[x,y], but can be written as

References

External links 

 A Mathematica implementation of a algorithm to matrix-factorize polynomials

Polynomials
Algebra
Polynomials factorization algorithms